Desmond Joseph O'Malley (2 February 1939 – 21 July 2021) was an Irish politician who served as Minister for Industry and Commerce from 1977 to 1981 and 1989 to 1992, Leader of the Progressive Democrats from 1985 to 1993, Minister for Trade, Commerce and Tourism from March 1982 to October 1982, Minister for Justice from 1970 to 1973 and Government Chief Whip and Parliamentary Secretary to the Minister of Defence from 1969 to 1970. He served as a Teachta Dála (TD) for the Limerick East constituency from 1968 to 2002.

A prominent Fianna Fáil member and government minister in the 1970s and 1980s, O'Malley went on to found the Progressive Democrats and served as the party's first leader from 1985 until 1993. He retired from politics at the 2002 general election.

Early life
O'Malley was born in Limerick in 1939. His family had long been involved in politics: His maternal grandfather, Denis O'Donovan, was murdered during the War of Independence by the Black and Tans, two of his uncles and his father held the office of Mayor of Limerick, and his uncle Donogh O'Malley was a Minister for Education.

O'Malley was educated at the Jesuit Crescent College and at University College Dublin, from which he graduated with a degree in law in 1962.

He was married to Pat McAleer, who predeceased him in 2017. They had six children, 4 daughters and two sons, including Fiona O'Malley.

Entering politics
In 1968, his uncle and sitting TD Donogh O'Malley died suddenly. Initially, Donogh's widow Hilda was asked by Fianna Fáil to stand in the coming by-election to try and retain the seat for the party. However, as Hilda was still in shock because of her husband's sudden death she declined and instead, after a canvass of many O'Malleys, Desmond O'Malley was selected and he stood in the subsequent by-election to fill the vacant seat. Desmond was successful and was elected to Dáil Éireann as a Fianna Fáil TD for the Limerick East constituency. At the time it was believed that this by-election victory by just 900 votes was partly due to Neil Blaney and his "Donegal Mafia". Blaney would subsequently deeply regret aiding O'Malley in his election as he always felt that Des was in the wrong party. The relationship between Desmond and Hilda was strained following Desmond's victory after Hilda had a change of heart about entering politics. She requested that Desmond stand aside in the 1969 Irish general election in favour of her becoming the main Fianna Fáil candidate, but Desmond refused. Both Desmond and Hilda stood in Limerick East in that 1969 Election, with Desmond for Fianna Fáil and Hilda as an Independent. Desmond came third while Hilda finished fifth in the four-seat constituency. Desmond was elected while Hilda just missed out. The "O'Malley vs O'Malley" dynamic of what was a very acrimonious contest drew enormous interest and discussion, to the point of attracting international headlines.

Arms Crisis and Minister for Justice
After the 1969 general election, O'Malley was appointed Parliamentary Secretary to the Taoiseach, Jack Lynch, and also Parliamentary Secretary to the Minister for Defence, Jim Gibbons. O'Malley had a central role in the prosecutions that arose from the Arms Crisis of 1970, the case against the accused government ministers Charles Haughey and Neil Blaney. The case was subsequently dismissed in the Supreme Court, where both ministers were acquitted.

In 1970, O'Malley succeeded Mícheál Ó Móráin as Minister for Justice. At age 31, O'Malley was the youngest Minister for Justice since Kevin O'Higgins who had presided over the tumultuous post-revolutionary period in Ireland in the 1920s following the Irish War of Independence and the Irish Civil War.

As Minister for Justice, O'Malley reinforced the Offences Against the State Act so that a person could be convicted of IRA membership on the word of a Garda Superintendent. He also introduced the Special Criminal Court, a juryless court presided over by three judges which tries cases of terrorism and serious organised crime, with the cited raison d'être being to avoid witness intimidation. O'Malley's plans to introduce internment without trial for Provisional IRA suspects in the Republic were not implemented, but following an assassination threat by the IRA he was permitted to carry a handgun at all times and was frequently moved from house to house.

O'Malley also introduced the Forcible Entry Bill, brought in to counter student agitation over the demolition of valued buildings. This move was bitterly despised by students in University College Dublin, who pelted him with eggs during a meeting in retaliation.

In opposition
Following the 1973 Irish general election Fianna Fáil were ousted from government for the first time in 16 years by Fine Gael and Labour, who had agreed to a pre-election pact to form a coalition should they win. In 1974 O'Malley cast doubts over the Fine Gael and Labour brokered Sunningdale Agreement, declaring "Ireland is one Ireland, one nation, one country because God made it one". O'Malley also opposed the Coalition's attempts to end the ban in Ireland of the sale of contraceptives. When a supreme court judge declared that "the deterrence of fornication and promiscuity" was "a legitimate legislative aim and a matter not of private but of public morality", O'Malley publicly agreed. O'Malley's view on this matter would evolve over time and later in his career, radically alter his relationship with Fianna Fáil.

Fianna Fáil majority
At the 1977 general election, Fianna Fáil received a 23-seat majority in Dáil Éireann and O'Malley became Minister for Industry and Commerce at a time when Ireland's economic fortunes were going into rapid decline. In 1979, following Jack Lynch's resignation as Taoiseach and leader of Fianna Fáil, two candidates fought in the leadership election, George Colley and Charles Haughey. O'Malley and Martin O'Donoghue managed Colley's campaign, but Haughey won. Colley and O'Malley retained their positions in the government, but O'Donoghue's department was scrapped.

Opposition to Haughey
  
Following the February 1982 general election, Fianna Fáil, led by Haughey, failed to win an overall majority in the Dáil. Haughey was seen as the main reason for the election defeat. George Colley threw his support behind O'Malley as a leadership challenger, but no vote on the party leadership was taken. Haughey was elected Taoiseach again after negotiating confidence and supply arrangements with Sinn Féin The Workers' Party and two independents. O'Malley was appointed to the Cabinet as Minister for Trade, Commerce and Tourism.

A large number of TDs quickly grew disillusioned with Haughey's leadership and threw their support behind O'Malley in an effort to oust the incumbent leader. On 1 October 1982, a challenge to Haughey was initiated by the Kildare TD, Charlie McCreevy. O'Malley was on holiday in Spain at the time but rushed back to put his own name forward as a possible alternative to Haughey. He and his supporters resigned from the Cabinet. Haughey won an open vote by 58 votes to 22, with the result that those TDs who voted against Haughey, including O'Malley, became known as the Gang of 22.

In December 1982, a Fine Gael–Labour Party coalition government took office and its Minister for Justice, Michael Noonan, revealed that Haughey's government had been involved in the tapping of certain journalists' telephones. This set off another leadership struggle, with O'Malley, Gerry Collins, Michael O'Kennedy, Brian Lenihan and John Wilson all showing an interest in replacing Haughey. However, an official inquiry into the telephone tapping cleared Haughey of any wrongdoing and put more blame on Martin O'Donoghue than the other TDs involved. Haughey retained the leadership by 40 votes to 33.

George Colley died in 1983 and Martin O'Donoghue was no longer a TD. O'Malley became isolated within Fianna Fáil, with many of his supporters giving up hope of ever beating Haughey.

Expulsion from Fianna Fáil
In May 1984, the New Ireland Forum report was published. Haughey had been a key figure in the Forum and had agreed to several possible solutions for solving the problem of Northern Ireland. However, he responded to the publication by declaring that the only possible solution was a United Ireland. O'Malley strongly criticised this position and accused Haughey of stifling debate. At a meeting of the Fianna Fáil Parliamentary Party to discuss the report the whip was removed from O'Malley.

In early 1985, the Fine Gael–Labour Party government introduced the Health (Family Planning) (Amendment) Bill 1985 to liberalise the sale of contraceptives. Fianna Fáil opposed the bill, but O'Malley considered it a matter of conscience and wanted to support it. O'Malley's speech was later praised as one of the best ever delivered in the Dáil. His famous phrase became "I stand by the Republic" stated during the extensive debates:

When the bill came to a vote, he abstained. However, that did not save him from Haughey's fury. On 26 February 1985, he was summoned to a party meeting and charged with "conduct unbecoming". Following a roll-call vote, he was expelled from Fianna Fáil by 73 votes to 9.

Progressive Democrats
Immediately afterwards, Desmond O'Malley was contacted by a young Fine Gael activist, Michael McDowell, who encouraged O'Malley to found a new political party and offered any help he could give. On 21 December 1985, O'Malley announced the formation of the Progressive Democrats. He was joined by Mary Harney (like O'Malley, an independent TD expelled from Fianna Fáil), and later by Fianna Fáil TDs Bobby Molloy and Pearse Wyse and Fine Gael TD Michael Keating. At the 1987 general election, the Progressive Democrats won 14 seats, making the new party the third-biggest in the Dáil. Among the TDs elected for the new party were O'Malley and his cousin Patrick O'Malley; Anne Colley, daughter of George Colley; Martin Gibbons, son of Jim Gibbons; Michael McDowell and Martin Cullen. Fianna Fáil returned to power with Haughey as head of a minority government.

Coalition with Fianna Fáil
In May 1989, Haughey called an early general election in the hope of winning an overall majority, but Fianna Fáil actually lost seats. The Progressive Democrats also lost seats, but held the balance of power. Haughey failed to be elected Taoiseach, as the Progressive Democrats voted for Fine Gael's leader Alan Dukes, but after Haughey formally resigned he entered into negotiations with the Progressive Democrats about forming a coalition. On 5 July 1989, Haughey and O'Malley agreed a deal for government, and O'Malley was appointed Minister for Industry and Commerce.

In 1990, Fianna Fáil's nominee in the presidential election was Brian Lenihan. A few weeks before the election a scandal broke over the accusation that Lenihan had phoned the President, Patrick Hillery in 1982, asking him not to dissolve the Dáil following the fall of Garret FitzGerald's government. Lenihan had always denied this, but now new evidence had come to light. O'Malley told Haughey that the Progressive Democrats would pull out of the coalition and support a no-confidence motion tabled by the opposition unless Lenihan left the government or Haughey opened an investigation into the incident. Haughey sacked Lenihan.

In early 1992, the programme for government was up for renewal. When it was revealed by Seán Doherty that Haughey had authorised the tapping of two journalists' telephones in 1982, O'Malley decided that the Progressive Democrats could no longer remain in his government. Haughey resigned on 11 February 1992 and was replaced as party leader and Taoiseach by Albert Reynolds. O'Malley and the Progressive Democrats continued in the coalition until Reynolds accused O'Malley of being "dishonest" while giving evidence to the Beef Tribunal. The collapse of the coalition led to the general election. Fianna Fáil returned to power in coalition with the Labour Party and the Progressive Democrats moved into Opposition.

Retirement and later life
In October 1993, O'Malley retired as leader of the Progressive Democrats. He was succeeded by Mary Harney, one of the co-founders of the party. In 1994, O'Malley ran for the European Parliament but was defeated by Pat Cox, a sitting MEP who left the Progressive Democrats to run as an independent when O'Malley was selected as the candidate to replace him. O'Malley remained as a TD until his retirement from politics at the 2002 general election, when he was succeeded as TD by his cousin Tim O'Malley. His daughter Fiona O'Malley was elected to the Dáil as a Progressive Democrats TD. His son Eoin O'Malley is a political scientist in the School of Law and Government at Dublin City University.

In October 2014 he released a memoir, Conduct Unbecoming: A Memoir. The book received mixed reviews. The Irish Examiner described it as "pungent and to the point" while  historian Diarmuid Ferriter, writing for the Irish Times, dismissed it as "an infuriatingly bad and poorly-written book", noting that "all sorts of assertions are made without evidence or elaboration and this approach is maintained throughout the book, underlining the lack of coherence or focus". Ferriter also took issue with a number of claims made by O'Malley particularly regarding the Arms Crisis.

O'Malley died on 21 July 2021 at the age of 82, having been in poor health for some time.

See also
Families in the Oireachtas

References

External links
Desmond O'Malley file at Limerick city library, Ireland

1939 births
2021 deaths
Leaders of Progressive Democrats
Fianna Fáil TDs
Members of the 18th Dáil
Members of the 19th Dáil
Members of the 20th Dáil
Members of the 21st Dáil
Members of the 22nd Dáil
Members of the 23rd Dáil
Members of the 24th Dáil
Members of the 25th Dáil
Members of the 26th Dáil
Members of the 27th Dáil
Members of the 28th Dáil
Politicians from County Limerick
Local councillors in County Limerick
Ministers for Justice (Ireland)
Parliamentary Secretaries of the 19th Dáil
Progressive Democrats TDs
People educated at Crescent College
Alumni of University College Dublin
Government Chief Whip (Ireland)
Ministers for Enterprise, Trade and Employment